The Coupe de France masculine de handball is an annual national cup competition for French men's handball clubs. Organized by the French Handball Federation, it first took place in 1957 but has been discontinued on several occasions. 

Montpellier Handball is the competition's most successful club as of 2021 with thirteen titles, followed by Paris Saint-Germain Handball with six.

Champions

Winners by season

Performances 

 Legend :  10 cups won ; (T) : title holder

References

See also 
 LNH
 Division 1
 Coupe de la Ligue
 Trophée des champions
 Coupe France (women)

Handball competitions in France
Recurring sporting events established in 2002